Hanseniella is a genus of flowering plants belonging to the family Podostemaceae.

Its native range is Thailand.

Species:
Hanseniella heterophylla 
Hanseniella smitinandii 

The genus is named after Mr. Hansen who collected plants in Thailand. It was first described and published in Bull. Mus. Natl. Hist. Nat., B, Adansonia Vol.14 on page 36 in 1992.

References

Podostemaceae
Malpighiales genera
Plants described in 1992
Flora of Thailand